Yehudit Sasportas (born 1969) is an Israeli artist. She is active in Israel and Germany. In 1997 she was awarded the Ingeborg Bachman Scholarship for her work and in 1999 the Nathan Gottesdiener Foundation prize.

Biography
Yehudit Sasportas was born in Ashdod in 1969. In her early works, for example, "Cradle" (1991) and "Trash Can Scale" (1996), she created three-dimensional structures based on images of household objects. Her work, "The Carpenter and the Seamstress" (2000), focuses on the architectural project of her parents apartment in housing project in Ashdod. In it she created a large installation from dimensions that combined sculpture and drawing. In the 2000s, her works began to include images from nature, mainly forests and swamps, and concrete and metaphorical dimensions. In addition, she began to work in the field of video. In 2007, she was the representative of Israel in The Guardians of the Threshold, 52 which took place at the Venice Biennale, Italy.

Education
1988–1989 College of Visual Art, Beersheva
1989–1993 B.F.A., Bezalel Academy of Arts and Design, Jerusalem
1993 Academy of Art and Science, Cooper Union Academy of Art, New York
1997–1999 M.F.A., Bezalel Academy of Arts and Design, Jerusalem

External links 
 Yehudit Sasportas Official Site
 
 Yehudit Sasportas Artist Page at Sommer Contemporary Art Website.

1969 births
Living people
20th-century Israeli women artists
21st-century Israeli women artists
Israeli sculptors
Israeli painters
Israeli installation artists
Bezalel Academy of Arts and Design alumni
Israeli contemporary artists